Ohio elected its members October 14, 1828.

See also 
 1828 Ohio's 6th congressional district special election
 1828 and 1829 United States House of Representatives elections
 List of United States representatives from Ohio

Notes 

1828
Ohio
United States House of Representatives